Deer Creek is a village in Tazewell and Woodford counties in the U.S. state of Illinois. The population was 704 at the 2010 census. Deer Creek is part of the Peoria, Illinois Metropolitan Statistical Area.

History 
Deer Creek was founded in 1830. Deer Creek received its name from the creek that ran through the northwest part of the village and the red deer that roamed the woods and came to the creek for water. In the late 1830s, Abraham Chaffer started the first business in Deer Creek at Chaffer's Corner, which was located in the center of Deer Creek Township. The location of Deer Creek has moved three times since 1830, from Chaffer's Corner to New Castle, from New Castle to Belmont, and from Belmont to the present site of Village of Deer Creek.

Government 
The Village of Deer Creek is governed by the Village President and Board of Trustees.

Elected Village Board Members:

 Village President: James Hackney
 Village Clerk: Lori Lewis
 Board of Trustees:
 Tony Berardi
 Mary Eschelbach
 Grant Hackney
 Ben Koch
 Mark Rich

Geography
Deer Creek is located at  (40.629252, -89.331626).

Demographics

As of the census of 2010, there were 704 people, 294 households, and 193 families residing in the village. The racial makeup of the village was 98.84% White, 0.50% Asian, 0.17% from other races, and 0.50% from two or more races. Hispanic or Latino of any race were 0.17% of the population.

There were 227 households, out of which 37.0% had children under the age of 18 living with them, 62.1% were married couples living together, 7.9% had a female householder with no husband present, and 26.9% were non-families. 21.6% of all households were made up of individuals, and 7.9% had someone living alone who was 65 years of age or older. The average household size was 2.67 and the average family size was 3.13.

In the village, the population was spread out, with 27.8% under the age of 18, 8.4% from 18 to 24, 30.4% from 25 to 44, 21.3% from 45 to 64, and 12.1% who were 65 years of age or older. The median age was 35 years. For every 100 females, there were 105.8 males. For every 100 females age 18 and over, there were 106.1 males.

The median income for a household in the village was $38,542, and the median income for a family was $43,750. Males had a median income of $31,985 versus $25,278 for females. The per capita income for the village was $17,578. About 6.6% of families and 5.5% of the population were below the poverty line, including 8.3% of those under age 18 and 3.9% of those age 65 or over.

Schools

 Dee-Mack Primary and Junior High school, located in Mackinaw, provides K-3rd grade and 7th-8th grade education for students residing in Deer Creek.
 Dee-Mack Intermediate school, located in Deer Creek, provides 4th-6th grade education for students residing in Deer Creek.
 Dee-Mack High school, located in Mackinaw, provides 9th-12th grade education for students residing in Deer Creek.  
 Both Deer Creek and Mackinaw students alike attend school in Deer Creek-Mackinaw District 701.

Notable person
Wilson Tucker, theater technician and writer.

References

External links
Official Village Website
Deer Creek Fire Protection District Website
Deer Creek-Mackinaw School District

Villages in Tazewell County, Illinois
Villages in Woodford County, Illinois
Villages in Illinois
Peoria metropolitan area, Illinois